After the War is a 2017 French drama film that was directed by Annarita Zambrano and was screened in the Un Certain Regard section at the 2017 Cannes Film Festival.

Cast
 Barbora Bobulova
 Giuseppe Battiston
 Fabrizio Ferracane
 Orfeo Orlando
 Charlotte Cétaire

References

External links
 

2017 films
2017 drama films
French drama films
2010s French-language films
2017 directorial debut films
2010s French films